The 2000 WNBA season was the 4th season for the Cleveland Rockers.

Offseason

Expansion Draft
The following players were selected by the Portland Fire in the draft.

 Alisa Burras (F) (4th pick)
 Jamila Wideman (G) (21st pick)

WNBA Draft

Regular season

Season standings

Season schedule

Playoffs

Player stats

References

Cleveland Rockers seasons
Cleveland
Cleveland Rockers